Joe Mavrinac Community Complex is an arena that opened in 1979 and named after former Kirkland Lake, Ontario, Canada mayor Joe Mavrinac. It has been the home of the Kirkland Lake Gold Miners, since 2011.

External links
 The Joe Mavrinac Community Complex

References 

Event venues established in 1979
Indoor arenas in Ontario
Indoor ice hockey venues in Canada
Kirkland Lake
Sports venues in Ontario
Buildings and structures in Timiskaming District
1979 establishments in Ontario